The 763rd Expeditionary Air Refueling Squadron is a provisional United States Air Force unit. It was last known to be assigned to the 363rd Expeditionary Operations Group at Al Dhafra Air Base, United Arab Emirates. The 363rd Group was inactivated on 25 August 2003. The squadron's current status is undetermined.

History
The squadron was activated by assuming the personnel of the 4413th Air Refueling Squadron, Provisional, on 1 December 1998. Its mission was to provide combat refueling of coalition aircraft assigned to United States Air Forces Central, primarily as part of Operation Southern Watch. It supported Operation Enduring Freedom beginning in 2002, and Operation Iraqi Freedom in 2003. Its headquarters, the 363rd Expeditionary Operations Group, was inactivated on 25 August 2003 with the closing of United States facilities at Prince Sultan Air Base, Saudi Arabia.

Lineage
 Activated as the 763rd Expeditionary Air Refueling Squadron on 1 December 1998
 Inactivated c. 25 August 2003

Assignments
 363rd Expeditionary Operations Group, 1 December 1998 – c. 23 August 2003

Stations
 Al Dhafra Air Base, United Arab Emirates, 1 Dec 1998 – ? c. 23 August 2003

Aircraft
 Boeing KC-135 Stratotanker, 1998–?

Awards and campaigns

References

Notes

Bibliography

External links

Air refueling squadrons of the United States Air Force
Air expeditionary squadrons of the United States Air Force